Canandaigua Historic District is a national historic district located at Canandaigua in Ontario County, New York. The district includes 354 residential, commercial,  religious, and civic properties (338 contributing) that constitute the historic core of Canandaigua.  It incorporates the North Main Street Historic District.  The structures date from the 1810s to 1930s and contains a number of distinctive buildings reflecting a variety of architectural styles including Greek Revival, Italianate, Colonial Revival.  The Ontario County Courthouse is located within the district boundaries. Located in the district is the separately listed former United States Post Office.

It was listed on the National Register of Historic Places in 1984. In 2016, an isolated area of 68 additional properties was added to the district after they were found to be sufficiently historic.

Gallery

See also

National Register of Historic Places listings in Ontario County, New York

References

External links

 Canandaigua Historic District pdf

Historic districts on the National Register of Historic Places in New York (state)
Colonial Revival architecture in New York (state)
Greek Revival architecture in New York (state)
Italianate architecture in New York (state)
Historic districts in Ontario County, New York
Canandaigua, New York
National Register of Historic Places in Ontario County, New York